Events from the year 1758 in Ireland.

Incumbent
Monarch: George II

Events
Summer – work begins on construction of what will become the Grand Canal near Dublin.
27 October – the ship Dublin Trader (Captain White) leaves Parkgate, Cheshire, for Dublin, and founders in the Irish Sea; she carries 70,000 Irish pounds in money and £80,000 in goods, while among the 60 passengers lost are Edward, fifth Earl of Drogheda, Theophilus Cibber (the English actor, bound for a season at the Smock Alley Theatre), and (probably) the mezzotint engraver Michael Ford.
The agriculturalist Richard Geoghegan reclaims a large tract of land from the sea at Ballyconneely in County Galway.
Mineral spring discovered at Lucan, Dublin.

Births
26 March – Samuel Greg, entrepreneur and pioneer of the factory system at Quarry Bank Mill (died 1834).
December – Mary Leadbeater, writer (died 1826).
Hans Blackwood, 3rd Baron Dufferin and Claneboye, politician (died 1839).
Approximate date – Charles "Hindoo" Stuart, East India Company officer (died 1828 in India).

Deaths
October – Michael Ford, mezzotint engraver.

References

 
Years of the 18th century in Ireland
Ireland
1750s in Ireland